Volfango De Biasi (born 22 February 1972) is an Italian director and screenwriter. He specializes in comedy films.

Life and career 
Born in Rome, De Biasi studied acting in Paris and Los Angeles, and in 1994 he made his professional acting debut in the indie drama film Movimenti. He then focused on directing, and directed a number of commercials, music videos, shorts and documentaries.

After directing a segment of the anthology film Esercizi di stile, De Biasi had his breakout in 2007 with the teen comedy Come tu mi vuoi, which  got a large commercial success.

Filmography 
Come tu mi vuoi (2007)
Iago (2009)
Un Natale stupefacente (2014) 
Natale col Boss (2015)
Natale a Londra – Dio salvi la regina (2016)
Nessuno come noi (2018)
L'agenzia dei bugiardi (2019)
Una famiglia mostruosa (2021)

References

External links 
 

1972 births
Living people
Italian film directors
Italian screenwriters
Film people from Rome
Italian male screenwriters